Project Rulison, named after the rural community of Rulison, Colorado, was an underground 40-kiloton nuclear test project  in the United States on September 10, 1969, about  SE of the town of Grand Valley, Colorado (now named Parachute, Colorado) in Garfield County. It was part of the Operation Mandrel weapons test series under the name Mandrel Rulison, as well as the Operation Plowshare project which explored peaceful engineering uses of nuclear explosions. The peaceful aim of Project Rulison was to determine if natural gas could be easily liberated from underground regions. This site remains under active monitoring by the U.S. Department of Energy Office of Legacy Management.

The test succeeded in liberating large quantities of natural gas; however the resulting radioactivity left the gas contaminated and unsuitable for applications such as cooking and heating homes. Although projected public radiation exposures from commercial use of stimulated gas had been reduced to less than 1% of background, it became clear in the early 1970s that public acceptance within the U.S. of any product containing radioactivity, no matter how minimal, was difficult if not impossible.

This was the second of three nuclear demonstration projects for natural-gas-reservoir stimulation as part of the Plowshare program. The other two were Project Gasbuggy in 1967 in northern New Mexico and Project Rio Blanco in 1973 in Colorado.

Clean up and later proposals for site
The Department of Energy began a cleanup of the site in the 1970s which was completed in 1998.  A buffer zone put in place by the state of Colorado still exists around the site.  A January 2005 report by the DOE stated that radioactivity levels were normal at the surface and in groundwater, though a later report due in 2007 was expected to more fully explore if there was subsurface contamination and whether or not radioactivity was still spreading outward from the blast site itself.

As of June 2005, the Houston, Texas-based company Presco was seeking to drill for natural gas within the buffer zone, putting in as many as four wells.  The company had initially received approval to drill one well, but the county dropped its support when more extensive plans were revealed.

A placard, erected in 1976, now marks the site where the blast took place. It is accessible via a gravel road, Garfield County Route 338.

References

External links
Rulison Site Environmental Management End State Vision – January 2005 DOE report (PDF)
Rulison Site, Office of Legacy Management

Explosions in 1969
1969 in Colorado
American nuclear weapons testing
Peaceful nuclear explosions
Explosions in the United States
Underground nuclear weapons testing